Major-General Russell Mortimer Luckock  (27 November 1877 – 1950) was a British Army officer who served as colonel of the King's Own Royal Regiment (Lancaster).

Military career
Mortimer Luckock, the son of Rt. Rev. Herbert Mortimer Luckock, was commissioned as a second lieutenant in the King's Own Royal Regiment (Lancaster) on 17 February 1900, and shortly thereafter left for South Africa to serve in the Second Boer War. He took part in operations in the Orange Free State from April to June 1900, then in the Transvaal, including the defense of Vryheid in December 1900. Promotion to lieutenant came while he served in South Africa, on 21 July 1900, and he received the Queen's South Africa Medal with three clasps. After the war had ended in June 1902, he returned home with the SS Kinfauns Castle, leaving Cape Town in early August 1902.

He later served in the First World War and went on to become Commandant of the Small Arms School in India in February 1922, Commander of 163rd Brigade in June 1926 and Brigadier on the General Staff at Southern Command in October 1928. After that he became General Officer Commander 54th (East Anglian) Infantry Division in September 1934. He also served as colonel of the King's Own Royal Regiment (Lancaster) (1945–47).

References

|-

1877 births
1950 deaths
British Army major generals
Companions of the Order of the Bath
Companions of the Order of St Michael and St George
Companions of the Distinguished Service Order
British Army personnel of World War I
King's Own Royal Regiment officers
British Army personnel of the Second Boer War